The Cisthenina are a subtribe of lichen moths in the family Erebidae, currently containing 428 described species.

Taxonomy
The subtribe used to be classified as the tribe Cisthenini of the subfamily Lithosiinae of the family Arctiidae.

Genera
The following genera are included in the subtribe.  

Aemene
Bruceia
Byrsia
Cisthene
Clemensia
Cyclosiella
Cyclosodes
Damias
Eugoa
Garudinia
Garudinistis
Haematomis
Holocraspedon
Hypoprepia
Katmeteugoa
Lobobasis
Lycomorpha
Lycomorphodes
Macaduma
Malesia
Meteugoa
Neoscaptia
Oxacme
Omiosia
Padenia
Parascaptia
Propyria
Pseudoblabes
Ptychoglene
Rhabdatomis
Scaptesyle
Tortricosia
Utriculofera

 
Lepidoptera subtribes